Sarkis Balasanyan (born August 17, 1978), professionally known as Super Sako, is an Armenian rapper, DJ and record producer based in Los Angeles. He is best known for his hit single "Mi Gna".

Career
As early as 2000, he started rapping and became more involved with Armenian singers such as Suro and Tatul Avoyan. He was most famous for collaborating with the “Twinz”, who were also Armenian rappers.

Later in 2008, Super Sako would release his first official album known as Saint Sarkis and it was a big hit. He would later release more albums throughout the years, which include Saint Sarkis 2, Saint Sarkis 3, Saint Sarkis 4, Sako and Friends, and his latest album Love Crimes.

His 2016 single "Mi Gna" taken from his album Love Crimes, and featuring rabiz singer Spitakci Hayko, became a hit in Armenia, the Armenian diaspora, Turkey, the Arab countries, and elsewhere. Artists who have covered the song include French rapper Maître Gims.

Discography

Albums
Saint Sarkis (2008)
Saint Sarkis 2 (2009)
Saint Sarkis 3 (2010)
Saint Sarkis 4 (2012)
Sako and Friends (2012)
Love Crimes (2016)

Charted singles

Other singles
2016: "Mi Gna" (feat. Spitakci Hayko)
2017: "Amena Lavnes" (feat. Harout Balyan)
2017: "She's Mine" (feat. Armenchik)
2018: "Mi Gna" (feat. Spitakci Hayko & Maître Gims)
2019: "Gna Gna/La Tghibi" (feat. Eyad Tannous & Suro)
2019: "Señorita" (feat. Fadi Kod)
2019: "Amenur es" (feat. Saro Tovmasyan)
2019։ "Samo tvoia" (feat. Andrea)
2020: "Tik Tok" (feat. Mohamed Ramadan)
2021: "Sunshine & Rain" (feat. Kan)
2021: "Amor Mio" (feat. Gipsy Kings)

Featured in
2019: "Yes" (Karl Wolf feat. Super Sako, Deena, Fito Blanko)
2021: "Sirts Patrasta" (OFI feat. Hak & Super Sako)

References

External links

 

Armenian rappers
Musicians from Yerevan
Armenian folk-pop singers
Living people
1978 births